Denise Lorraine Davis, better known by her stage name Rainy Davis, is an American songwriter, singer and record producer. Out of four Billboard charted singles, Davis is known best for her song "Sweetheart". The single was originally released on the New York-based independent label called Supertronics Records. However, after the song became a hit in the clubs, then on urban radio and eventually crossing over to pop radio, Columbia Records A&R Exec Joe McEwen offered Rainy Davis a production-artist deal for worldwide physical distribution, which included buying Davis's previous contract from Supertronics. Rainy Davis went on to record two albums for Columbia and received numerous awards for her contributions to hit songs over the years.

In 2005, when digital music distribution was new to the majority of independent artists and label professionals, Davis, founder and president of Rainysongs, set up her online entertainment company with worldwide digital distribution. This was one of the first digital music distribution labels owned by an African American woman. Davis was also one of the pioneers to structure the foundation for fair digital recording agreements in the U.S.

In 2010, Davis and her company Rainysongs introduced a digital technology platform to North America that empowers independent music professionals to control their digital music content worldwide online.

Biography
Davis was born and raised in Brooklyn, New York. Even before being famous, Davis was paying her dues. She was singing with a local band called Jamilia (with band members Keith Sweat, Charisse Davis until she joined the female singing group Musique, created and produced by Patrick Adams, which garnered the club pop hits "In the Bush" and "Keep On Jumpin."

After a few weeks of rehearsals with their new band, Musique was out on the road, and Rainy Davis was a live performance member of the female trio group Musique with Becky Bell and Marisa Dejean. Rainy was now on her first tour as a member of a group with two songs that hit #1 on the Billboard Disco Action Charts and then crossing over to a pop hit record. The tour was booked throughout North America by the Norby Walters Agency.

At the request of Amir Bayyan, (personal friend of the Jacksons), Rainy Davis wrote "Sweetheart" for Janet Jackson with her songwriting partner Pete Warner. When the demo was finished, all the songs for Janet's 1986 album Control, had been chosen. Amir Bayyan, Christine Bayyan, and Chris Lord-Alge suggested to Davis that she release the song herself, and, as a result, it became a major hit in the dance and club scene and on urban and pop radio.

Columbia Records signed Rainy Davis in 1987 and dubbed her 'America's Sweetheart', then sent Davis on a national tour to support her debut album. The tour included an appearance on Don Cornelius' TV show Soul Train and a performance at the world-famous Apollo Theatre in Harlem, New York. Davis was also a presenter at the Rhythm & Blues awards at Bally's in Las Vegas.

Rainy Davis remains a creative force in the entertainment industry and is a Grammy-nominated songwriter, accomplished music publisher, producer, and recording artist. Her publishing company Rainysongs, is a member of ASCAP and holds controlling interests in the Sweetheart copyrights. Collectively with various album releases by Mariah Carey and Jermaine Dupri with the inclusion of "Sweetheart", album sales exceed 22 million physical records worldwide. Davis' additional production and songwriting and releases include the Cover Girls' "Spring Love" from the album Show Me; Inner Life and Jocelyn Brown's "I Want to Give You Me" from I'm Caught Up, Apollo 440's "Sweetheart" sample from the album The Descending Dudes and 275 more licenses issued by Harry Fox.

Discography

Albums

Album credits

  I'm Caught Up (In a One Night Love Affair) - composer, publisher
  Sweetheart (1987) - primary artist, composer, producer, publisher
  Show Me (1987) - composer, producer, publisher
  Ouch (1988) - primary artist, composer, producer, publisher
  Best of 1987 - 1990 - The Cover Girls (1996) - composer, producer, publisher
  The Greatest Hits - The Cover Girls (1998) - composer, producer, publisher
  Life In 1472 - Jermaine Dupri (1998) - composer, publisher
  #1's - Mariah Carey (1998) - composer, publisher
  Greatest Hits - Mariah Carey (2001) - composer, publisher
  The Remixes - Mariah Carey (2003) - composer, publisher
  Dude Descending - Apollo 440 (2003) - composer, publisher
  Sweetheart (A Story Book Romance) (2011) - primary artist, composer, producer, publisher
  The Essential Mariah Carey (2011) - composer, producer, publisher
  Sweetheart (Collectors Edition) (2015) - primary artist, composer, producer, publisher

Singles

Singles credits
  "Sweetheart" (1986) - primary artist, composer, producer, publisher
  Lowdown So & So (1986) - primary artist, composer, producer, publisher
  Spring Love - The Cover Girls (1987) - composer, producer, publisher
  Still Waiting (1987) - primary artist, producer
  4-Ever (1987) - primary artist, composer, producer, publisher
  Indian Giver (1988) - primary artist, composer, producer, publisher
  Ouch (1988) - primary artist, composer, producer, publisher
  Storybook Romance (1993) - primary artist, composer, producer, publisher
  Sweetheart - Jermaine Dupri (1998) - composer, publisher
 Number 1's Sweetheart - Mariah Carey (1998) - composer, publisher
  CC'S Mystique (2011) - primary artist, composer, producer, publisher

References

External links 
 Myspace
 Facebook
 Twitter
 Hi5

Year of birth missing (living people)
Living people
Columbia Records artists
American women singer-songwriters
American singer-songwriters
American contemporary R&B singers
American freestyle musicians
21st-century American women